Kinarut is a town in the state of Sabah, Malaysia. It is located about 20 kilometres south of the state capital, Kota Kinabalu, and Kinarut railway station is one of the stops on the Sabah State Railway. Kinarut is under the administration of the Papar District.

Etymology 
Several theories exist as to the etymological origins of the name 'Kinarut'. One such theory is that it refers to a street in the town which was formerly called China Road. Another theory is that it originated from the Dusun word Kinorut which means 'cutting using a knife'.

History 

Kinarut originally belonged to the Sultanate of Brunei. In the late 17th century, when Sultan Abdul Hakkul Mubin had to withdraw from Chermin Island (Pulau Chermin) during the Brunei Civil War, he built a base in Kinarut at a strategic location protected by two rivers. He remained there for ten years as the Sultan of Kinarut, during which incidents of piracy in the surrounding seas decreased significantly. With help from the local Bajau and Dusun people, he managed to counter several attacks from Sultan Muhyiddin.

Demographics
A 2010 census estimated the population of Kinarut at 18,029. This population consists mainly of Bajaus, Bruneian Malays, Kadazans and Chinese (of whom most are Hakka Chinese)  There is also a large Filipino refugee settlement in Kinarut, which has reportedly caused ethnic tension among locals.

Attractions 

Kinarut is noted for its weekly tamu, an open air market dominated by native sellers which is held every Saturday. It is also close to Dinawan Island, Lok Kawi Wildlife Centre and the Kinarut Mansion ruins.

Notes

References 

Towns in Sabah